Ward Winter Reese (February 12, 1870 – August 17, 1927) was an American college football coach and reverend of the Episcopal Church. He served as the head football at the Franklin & Marshall College in Lancaster, Pennsylvania in 1895, compiling a record of 3–5–1.

Reese was a graduate of the University of Pennsylvania and attended Harvard Divinity School. He served as archdeacon of the Episcopal Diocese of Utah and rector of St. Pauls Episcopal Church in Salt Lake City and was later rector of Christ Church in Bowling Green, Kentucky. Reese died on August 17, 1927, in Bowling Green.

Head coaching record

References

External links
 

1870 births
1927 deaths
American Episcopal priests
Franklin & Marshall Diplomats football coaches
Harvard Divinity School alumni
University of Pennsylvania alumni
Sportspeople from Lancaster, Pennsylvania
Coaches of American football from Pennsylvania